The Ministry of Justice of Liberia is an organisation responsible for providing "effective, efficient and excellent public safety and legal services which promote the rule of law, ensure the safety and security of the public and uphold the interest of the government and people of the Republic of Liberia."

List of ministers

See also 

 Justice ministry
 Politics of Liberia

References 

Justice ministries
Government of Liberia